"All We Got" is a song by American rapper Chance the Rapper featuring Kanye West and Chicago Children's Choir, from Chance's third mixtape Coloring Book (2016). It contains vocals from Francis Starlite, Grace Weber, Isaiah Robinson, Jack Red, Sima Cunningham, Teddy Jackson and Vasil Garvanliev. A remix was shared by SBTRKT in March 2018.

Background
Chance didn't originally plan for the song to be the kickoff track on the mixtape. SBTRKT shared a remix of it on March 22, 2018.

Creation
"Music is all we got" is a West lyric and Chance revealed that "All We Got" was a perfect record because it wasn't the first one they made for the lyric. He also elaborated on how West added his touch to the song sonically.

Commercial performance
The song debuted at number 2 on the US Billboard Bubbling Under Hot 100 and spend a total of two weeks on the chart. It debuted at number 45 on the US Hot R&B/Hip-Hop Songs chart in the same week as this.

Charts

References

2016 songs
Chance the Rapper songs
Gospel songs
Kanye West songs
Song recordings produced by Kanye West
Songs written by Chance the Rapper
Songs written by Kanye West